Amabilis uchoensis is a species of prehistoric pleurodiran turtle from the Late Cretaceous of South America. It is the only species in the genus Amabilis.

Description
Hermanson et al. (2020) described the Late Cretaceous turtle Amabilis uchoensis  based on a single partial skull from the São José do Rio Preto Formation, in the Brazilian state of São Paulo. The São José do Rio Preto Formation is thought to have been deposited during the Santonian age of the Late Cretaceous, between 86.3 and 83.6 million years ago.

The type-specimen skull, which is 2.25 cm long and 2.06 cm wide, suggests that the animal was smaller than any other fossil turtles found in Brazil's Bauru Group. Modern Brazilian river turtles are also considerably larger, ranging in length from 34 cm (Podocnemis erythrocephala) to 90 cm (Podocnemis expansa.) This skull is deposited in Uchoa's Museum of Paleontology. 

The fossil is in the suborder Pleurodira, also known as "side-necked turtles" because their defensive posture hides the head under the shell by pulling the head to one side, rather than by withdrawing the head directly back under the shell.

The Amabilis genus is part of the superfamily or pan-group Podocnemidoidae, which groups the family Podocnemididae together with some related extinct genera, as well as the extinct family Peiropemydidae. Podocnemidoids, first seen in the Late Cretaceous, were once widely distributed across "North and South America, Europe, Asia, and Africa," according to Gaffney et al. (2011.)  No surviving turtle species descend directly from Amabilis, which is therefore considered to be a stem group within its family and super-family. Because it is a member of Podocnemidoidae but not a member of the Podocnemididae. Hermanson et al. describe it as "a non-podocnemidid member of Podocnemidoidae."

According to the local newspaper Diário da Região, A. uchoensis was the first fossil turtle found in the São José do Rio Preto region (near the city of São Paulo). The turtle skull fragment was found by Brazilian paleontologist Fabiano Vidoi Iori, very near to the 2014 discovery site of carnivorous dinosaur Thanos simonattoi.

Name
The name Amabilis, according to Hermanson et al., is from the "Latin for 'lovable', for its tiny size." "Amabilis" (from the Latin verb "amare," to love) can also mean "lovely" in biological names. For example the large evergreen fir tree Abies amabilis, is described as "lovely" rather than "lovable." Many other species are named "amabilis": for example the moon orchid (Phalaenopsis amabilis), a Norwegian copepod (Elaphoidella amabilis), an Ecuadorian toad (Rhinella amabilis), and the Australasian lovely fairy wren (Malurus amabilis).

References

External links

 Paleobiology Database Amabilis uchoensis

Pleurodira
Late Cretaceous reptiles of South America
Santonian genera
Cretaceous Brazil
Fossils of Brazil
Fossil taxa described in 2020
Late Cretaceous turtles
Prehistoric turtle genera